Big Prairie may refer to:

 Big Prairie Township, Michigan
 Big Prairie (Montana), a meadow and former settlement in Flathead County
 Big Prairie, Ohio, an unincorporated community